Anna High School is a public high school in Anna, Ohio.  It is the only high school in the Anna Local Schools district, which is predominantly rural.  Agriculture is a major occupation among district residents, with many others working in factory production, retail businesses, and at the Honda Anna Engine Plant.  A large percentage of the school district's tax revenues are received from Honda, so it is the primary tax contributor in the school district and is crucial to the district's financial stability.

Anna students regularly score above state and national standards on standardized tests, and ACT scores are regularly above the national average.

Anna Schools are expanding in the use of technology in its schools with students regularly using many different technologies for school work.  The elementary school was designed with such technology in mind and has the wiring capability built-in to expand on that technology as new developments occur.  Both district buildings are networked, have fiber-optic cables connecting the two buildings, and have access to distance learning.

A wide range of extracurricular activities is available to students.  Whether a student's interests are athletics, dramatics, music, or clubs; there are many excellent extracurricular choices for them.

The Anna Rockets are primarily members of the Shelby County Athletic League, but are football members of the Midwest Athletic Conference.

Athletics
Anna is a member of the Shelby County Athletic League.  They have captured more than 75 league championships in various SCAL sports.  The football program started in 2000, and were an independent before joining the Cross County Conference in 2001.  They were a member of the Cross County Conference for a total of 5 years, winning 2 league titles.  The football team has been a member of the Midwest Athletic Conference since 2006, and they captured their first MAC title in 2018. In 2019, The Anna Rockets won their first football State Championship in both School History and Shelby County history, by winning a state title before rival county schools Lehman, Sidney and Fort Loramie.

OHSAA State Championships

 Boys Football - 2019
 Girls Volleyball – 2006
 Boys Cross Country – 1994, 1995
 Girls Basketball – 1981, 2011, 2013
 Boys Baseball – 1972, 1980
 Girls Track and Field - 2017

OHSAA State Runners-Up

 Girls Basketball - 2012
 Boys Baseball - 1968
 Boys Track and Field - 2011

OHSAA State Final Four

 Girls Volleyball - 1987, 2005
 Boys Basketball - 2008
 Girls Basketball - 1982, 2020
 Boys Track and Field - 2015 (4th)

External links
 District Website
 Cross Country/Track & Field

Notes and references

High schools in Shelby County, Ohio
Public high schools in Ohio